The 2013 Pan-American Volleyball Cup was the twelfth edition of the annual women's volleyball tournament, played by twelve countries over June, 2013 in Lima, Callao, Iquitos, Huacho, in Peru. Team USA defeated 3–0 to the Dominican Republic in the gold medal match, Argentina took the bronze over Brazil. Puerto Rico and Cuba joined the previous four teams, qualifying to the 2014 FIVB World Grand Prix.

Competing nations

Pool standing procedure
Match won 3–0: 5 points for the winner, 0 point for the loser
Match won 3–1: 4 points for the winner, 1 points for the loser
Match won 3–2: 3 points for the winner, 2 points for the loser
In case of tie, the teams were classified according to the following criteria:
points ratio and sets ratio

Group A

Group B

Group C

Final round

Championship bracket

5th and 8th places bracket

9th and 12th places bracket

Classification 7–10

Quarterfinals

Classification 9–12

Classification 5–8

Semifinals

11th place match

9th place match

7th place match

5th place match

Bronze medal match

Gold medal match

Final standing

Individual awards

Most Valuable Player
  Nicole Fawcett
Best Scorer
  Samantha Bricio
Best Spiker
  Megan Hodge
Best Blocker
  Jaimie Thibeault
Best Server
  Nicole Fawcett
Best Digger
  Lucia Gaido
Best Setter
  Yael Castiglione
Best Receiver
  Kayla Banwarth
Best Libero
  Lucia Gaido

References

Women's Pan-American Volleyball Cup
Pan-American Volleyball Cup
Women's Pan-American Volleyball Cup
2013 Women's Pan-American Volleyball Cup
Sports competitions in Lima